The Journal of Nuclear Cardiology is a peer-reviewed medical journal covering research in nuclear cardiology. It is published by Springer Science+Business Media and is the official journal of the American Society of Nuclear Cardiology. The editor-in-chief is Ami E. Iskandrian (The University of Alabama at Birmingham). The founding editor was Barry L. Zaret (Yale University School of Medicine). According to the Journal Citation Reports, the journal has a 2016 impact factor of 3.930.

Abstracting and indexing
This journal is indexed by the following services:
 Science Citation Index Expanded
 Journal Citation Reports/Science Edition 
 PubMed/Medline 
 SCOPUS 
 EMBASE
 Academic OneFile 
 CINAHL 
 Current Contents/Clinical Medicine 
 EMCare 
 Summon by Serial Solutions

References

External links
 

Springer Science+Business Media academic journals
Cardiology journals
Radiology and medical imaging journals
Bimonthly journals